The 168th Wing (168 WG) is a unit of the Alaska Air National Guard, stationed at Eielson Air Force Base, Fairbanks, Alaska. Before it was redesignated in February 2016, it was known as the 168th Air Refueling Wing (168 ARW).  If activated to federal service as a USAF unit, the 168 WG is primarily gained by Pacific Air Forces, while its 213th Space Warning Squadron is gained by Air Force Space Command.

Overview
The 168th Wing is the only Arctic region air refueling unit in the United States and maintains a substantial number of personnel on active duty and civilian Air Reserve Technician status in order to meet its daily operational requirements. The unit transfers more fuel than any other Air National Guard tanker wing, because nearly all receivers are active duty aircraft, many of which are on operational missions.

The 168th Wing provides the U.S. Air Force the capabilities of global reach and vigilance through the combined operations of air refueling, missile warning, and space surveillance. The unit maintains a constant watch and commitment for Pacific Air Forces, U.S. Northern Command, Air Force Space Commands and the Alaskan North American Aerospace Defense Command (NORAD) Region.

In 2000, the wing became mobility-tasked, which has been a true opportunity for growth and learning.  Besides its federally directed missions, as a unit of the Alaska National Guard, the 168th Wing is an asset of the Governor of Alaska and as such, the Governor can direct the unit to respond to emergencies declared or missions required within the State.

The 168th Wing completed its R-model conversion in 1995, and in 2000 they completed a major flight deck upgrade called "Pacer CRAG" – with the CRAG standing for Compass, Radar, and GPS (Global Positioning System). The Wing's Primary Assigned Aircraft are nine KC-135 R-models assigned to the 168th Air Refueling Squadron. The wing aircraft are identified with a blue tail stripe, and the name "Alaska".

Because of Alaska's strategic location with regard to national defense, the mission and importance of the 168th Wing and the Alaska Air National Guard should continue to increase in the coming years. The 168th Wing has a remarkably broad range of responsibilities.

Units
The 168th Wing consists of the following units:
 168th Operations Group (168 OG)
 168th Air Refueling Squadron (168 ARS)
 168th Operations Support Flight (168 OSF)

 168th Maintenance Group (168 MXG)
 168th Aircraft Maintenance Squadron (168 AMXS)
 168th Maintenance Squadron (168 MXS)
 168th Maintenance Operations Flight (168 MOF)

 168th Mission Support Group (168 MSG)
 168th Communications Flight(168 CF)
 168th Logistics Readiness Squadron (168 LRS)
 168th Mission Support Flight (168 MSF)
 168th Security Forces Squadron (168 SFS)
 168th Civil Engineers Squadron (168 CES)

 168th Medical Group (168 MDG)

 213th Space Warning Squadron (213 SWS), a Geographically Separated Unit (GSU) located at Clear Air Force Station, Alaska
The 213th SWS is responsible for providing tactical warning and attack assessment of a ballistic missile attack against the continental United States and southern Canada. Warning data from the unit is forwarded to the North American Aerospace Defense Command inside Cheyenne Mountain Air Force Station, Colorado. The squadron is also responsible for a portion of the Air Force Space Command's Space Surveillance System and assists in tracking more than 9,500 space objects currently in Earth's orbit.

Emblem

The upper right of the shield consists of a compass rose against a yellow background. The compass rose signifies the global nature of the Wing mission and is set at a 30-degree angle to the east representing the magnetic variation of Alaska where the Group was first formed. The yellow background represents the midnight sun at high latitude and the day aspect of the air refueling mission. The lower left of the shield depicts a red lightning bolt running from cloud to cloud against a blue background. The red lightning bolt signifies the projection of military power, the clouds are the medium in which it performs its mission, and the blue background the Arctic night and the night aspect of its mission. The red lightning bolt is also a prominent feature of the squadron patch from which the 168th Wing evolved. Between the yellow and blue fields is a bar of ultramarine blue containing eight yellow stars. The ultramarine blue is Air Force blue representing the 168th Wing's role in the Total Force; it is also the background color of the Alaska flag. The eight yellow stars are the stars of the big dipper also found on the Alaska flag.

History
Established on 23 October 1990 when the Alaska ANG 168th Air Refueling Squadron was expanded to a group level. The 168th Air Refueling Squadron traces its lineage to the 437th Bombardment Squadron of the 319th Bombardment Group, originally activated at Barksdale Field, Louisiana, in June 1942.

From a modest beginning in 1986, with just four KC-135E aircraft transferred from the Arkansas Air National Guard at Little Rock AFB,  the unit has blossomed into Wing status and all the accouterments of a full Air Refueling Wing. The first rendezvous and refueling of the squadron occurred just weeks after the arrival of the first aircraft. The pilot in command was Lt Col Tom Gresch, and the navigator conducting the rendezvous was Capt Michael R. Stack, formerly of the Illinois Air National Guard's 126th Air Refueling Wing in Chicago.  In 1995, the wing transitioned from the KC-135E to the KC-135R Stratotanker.   

The 168 WG has command and control over thirteen subordinate assigned units whose missions include all aircraft maintenance for the PACAF-gained tankers, providing financial, transportation, contracting, and base supply resources, communications, data processing and visual information functions, organizational security, and disaster preparedness and air base operability.  They also contain all personnel activities such as training, equal employment opportunity and recruiting, and limited diagnostic and therapeutic service in general medicine, flight medicine, bioenvironmental, environmental, and dental services. 

Previously designated as the 168th Air Refueling Wing since 1992, the unit was redesignated as the 168th Wing (168 WG) on 3 Feb 2016, recognizing of the inclusion of the 213th Space Warning Squadron, a geographically separated unit (GSU) at Clear Air Force Station, Alaska.  The squadron had been part of the wing since 2006 and the redesignation of the parent wing recognized the dual-mission sets of both air refueling and ballistic missile early warning that the wing now performed.

Operations and decorations
In January 1994, January 1996, and January 2004, the 168 ARW received the Air Force Outstanding Unit Award.
In April 1996 and again in 1997, the 168 ARW won one of the five annual Distinguished Flying Unit Plaques sponsored by the National Guard Association of the United States.
Also in 1997, the wing earned the Curtis N. "Rusty" Metcalf Trophy, awarded to the tactical/strategic airlift or air refueling flying unit demonstrating the highest standards of mission accomplishment over a sustained period each year.

Lineage
 Designated 168th Air Refueling Group and allotted to Alaska ANG, 1990
 Extended federal recognition and activated, 23 October 1990
 Status changed from Group to Wing, 1 Jun 1992
 Re-designated as: 168th Air Refueling Wing on 1 Jun 1992
 Re-designated as: 168th Wing on 3 Feb 2016

Assignments
 Alaska Air National Guard, 23 Oct 1990
 Gained by: Strategic Air Command, 23 Oct 1990 – 1 Jun 1992 
 Gained by: Pacific Air Forces, 1 Jun 1992 – present

Components
 168th Operations Group, 1 Jun 1992 – present.
 168th Air Refueling Squadron, 23 Oct 1990 – present
 213th Space Warning Squadron, 30 Aug 2006 – present

Stations
 Eielson AFB, Alaska, 23 Oct 1990 – present
 Additional GSU (213 SWS) at Clear AFS, Alaska, 2006 - present.

Aircraft
 KC-135D Stratotanker, 1990-1996
 KC-135E Stratotanker, 1990-1995
 KC-135R Stratotanker, 1995 – present

See also

 344th Bombardment Group

References

 168th Wing (official site)

External links
 Eielson Air Force Base
 Alaska Air National Guard

Wings of the United States Air National Guard
Military units and formations in Alaska
0168